ISO/IEC 9075 standard: "Information technology - Database languages - SQL", which describes Structured Query Language.

See details by release:
 SQL-86 (or SQL-87) is the ISO 9075:1987 standard of 1987
 SQL-89 is the ISO/IEC 9075:1989 standard of 1989
 SQL-92 is the ISO/IEC 9075:1992 standard of 1992
 SQL:1999 is the ISO/IEC 9075:1999 standard of 1999
 SQL:2003 is the ISO/IEC 9075:2003 standard of 2003
 SQL:2006 is the ISO/IEC 9075:2006 standard of 2006
 SQL:2008 is the ISO/IEC 9075:2008 standard of 2008
 SQL:2011 is the ISO/IEC 9075:2011 standard of 2011
 SQL:2016 is the ISO/IEC 9075:2016 standard of 2016

External links
 "ISO/IEC JTC 1/SC 32" technical committee.

SQL
09075